No. 190 Squadron was a Royal Air Force squadron with a relatively short existence, but a very broad career. It served as a trainer squadron during the first World War and as convoy escort, airborne support and transport squadron during World War II.

History

Formation in World War I
No 190 Squadron was formed at Rochford, England on 24 October 1917 as a night training squadron operating amongst others the Royal Aircraft Factory BE.2e and the Airco DH.6. The squadron moved to RAF Newmarket, Suffolk on 14 March 1918 and was disbanded a year later at RAF Upwood in April 1919.

Reformation with Coastal Command
The squadron was re-formed on 1 March 1943 at Sullom Voe, Scotland. The squadron operated the Consolidated Catalina to patrol the North Atlantic. The first U-boat was sunk in the first month of operations. The main role of the squadron was protecting the convoys to and from Russia ("Operation Locomotive"). The squadron disbanded on 31 December 1943, when it was re-numbered to 210 Squadron.

Airborne Forces squadron
The squadron was re-formed again five days later, on 5 January 1944 at RAF Leicester East as an airborne support unit flying the Short Stirling. It became part of 38 Group on 6 November 1943. On 6 June 1944 the squadron first carried 426 paratroopers to Caen, France. The squadron then returned and the next night towed 18 Airspeed Horsa gliders into France. It moved to RAF Fairford and carried out supply-dropping missions to the advancing troops and SOE operatives. The squadron involvement in supply drops at Battle of Arnhem caused 11 aircraft losses in 3 days.
The next move was to RAF Great Dunmow where it towed gliders for the Rhine crossing and paratroopers into the Netherlands to disrupt the German retreat.

On Halifaxes as Transport Squadron
As the war ended the squadron re-equipped with the Handley Page Halifax which it used as a freighter for Transport Command until the end of 1945. It was disbanded at Great Dunmow on 21 January 1946 by being renumbered to 295 Squadron.

Aircraft operated

Squadron stations

Commanding officers

See also
 No 38 Group RAF
 List of Royal Air Force aircraft squadrons

References

Notes

Bibliography

External links

 World War II 38 Group Squadrons
 No 190 Squadron (RAF): Second World War
 Squadron page on MOD site
 Squadron History on RafWeb's 'Air of Authority'

190 Squadron
Aircraft squadrons of the Royal Air Force in World War II
Military units and formations established in 1917
1917 establishments in England
Military units and formations disestablished in 1946